The Kerala Government Secretariat is the seat of administration of the Government of Kerala, in Thiruvananthapuram, housing important ministries and bureaucratic offices. It is the highest echelon of state administrative structure offering locus for the exercise of executive authority by the State Government of Kerala. The secretariat refers to the complex of departments. Its political heads are the ministers while the administrative heads are the Secretaries to the Government. The Government Secretariat is a popular landmark and located in heart of the Thiruvananthapuram City, in Narmada Road. The Secretariat complex was originally constructed as Durbar Hall for Travancore Kingdom.

History 

Over 150 years old, the building's foundation stone was laid by His Highness Ayilyam Thirunal, the Maharaja of Travancore in 1865 and was completed in 1869. The original structure was planned to accommodate Travancore Royal Durbar Hall where the King meets his council of ministers on a monthly basis apart from the offices of Peshkars (Secretaries of the State). It was designed and built under Barton, the then chief engineer of Travancore and incorporates elements of Roman and Dutch architecture. The construction was supervised by the then Dewan, T. Madhava Rao, whose statue now stands across the road opposite the building. 

His Highness Chithira Tirunal, the last king of Travancore, was crowned king in a ceremony held at the Secretariat. The Secretariat also housed the Kerala State Legislative Assembly from 1939 before it moved to the new building. Lord Willingdon, the then Viceroy laid the foundation stone for the new Assembly Building on 12 December 1933 and it was opened on 6 February 1939 by Dewan Sir C. P. Ramaswami Iyer and the Second Sri Mulam popular Assembly convened in this building that year. 

Known during the princely era as the Huzur or Puthen Kacheri, it was renamed the Government Secretariat in 1949. The Secretariat is the nerve centre of Kerala's governance and hence is also the site of political protests and it often witnesses marches and demonstrations outside its walls.

Structure 

Kerala Secretariat Complex consists of 3 blocks. The central block is the oldest structure. The Central Block has main door known as Ana Kavadam (Elephant Door), which opens to the grand Durbar Hall. This Durbar hall earlier was used only by Travancore Maharaja and his courtiers with limited public entry. Today the Durbar Hall is converted into State Ceremonies Hall where public meetings and state ceremonies are held.

There are 20 doors located in either side of the Durbar Hall. The Central block has 2 stories and houses offices of various departments. The Old Assembly Hall is located in ground floor of the Central Block at the right, which is now converted into a public legislative museum, depicting the legislative history of Kerala. There are plans to introduce Kerala Institute of Parliamentary Affairs to this complex.

Apart from the central block, two new blocks, North Block and South block, were constructed on either side of the central block. The  South block was opened by the then Hon. Chief Minister of Kerala Sri. Pattom A. Thanupillai on 18 August 1961. Later two "Sandwich" blocks were also constructed in between the central and the new blocks.  The North Block, located at North Gate, houses office of the Hon. Chief Minister of Kerala, offices of a few cabinet ministers and cabinet room. The South Sandwich Block and North Sandwich Block houses primarily offices Government secretaries, though a few offices of ministers are located here due to congestion in north block.

Departments 

Kerala Secretariat complex houses offices of various state government department. The business of the State Government is transacted through the following Secretariat Department based on the Kerala Secretariat Rules of Business (KSRB).

 Agriculture Department
 Co-operation Department
 Cultural Affairs Department
 Election Department
 Finance Department
 Fisheries and Ports Department
 Food and Civil Supplies Department
 Forests and Wild Life Department
 General Administration Department
 General Education Department
 Health and Family Welfare Department
 Higher Education Department
 Home Department
 Housing Department
 Industries Department
 Information Technology Department
 Irrigation Department
 Labour and Rehabilitation Department
 Law Department
 Local Self Governments Department
 Personnel and Administrative Reforms Department
 Planning and Economic Affairs Department
 Power Department
 Public Works Department
 Transport Department
 Tourism Department
 Revenue Department
 Rural Development Department
 Scheduled Castes and Scheduled Tribes Development Department
 Science, Technology and Environment Department
 Social Welfare Department
 Stores Purchase Department
 Taxes Department
 Vigilance Department
 Excise Department

References 

Buildings and structures in Thiruvananthapuram
Administrative headquarters of state governments in India
Government buildings in Kerala